Laugh USA is a Sirius XM Radio channel featuring family comedy and broadcasts on channel 98. The channel's slogan is "Comedy for Everyone."  The comedy aired sometimes contains mild profanities and slightly risqué material, and is only very rarely considered offensive.

Artists
Although  much variety exists in the format, comedian segments commonly include Bill Cosby, Bill Engvall, Brian Regan, Carl Hurley, Chonda Pierce, Father Guido Sarducci, Gabriel Iglesias, Jeanne Robertson, and others.  Vintage routines can also be heard, including classics from Abbott and Costello, Bob Newhart, Bob and Ray, Henny Youngman, Mel Brooks, and Rodney Dangerfield, among others.

Features
Before the merger in 2008, this channel featured a weekly mix known as the Comedy Piñata hosted by Joel Haas, where comedy was often delivered on a single topic, often seasonal, from various of its comedians' routines. Comedy Piñata was also known to highlight a single artist, whether by simply presenting a comedy concert, or in a format where standup comedy segments are woven into a sit-down interview presentation.

External links
Laugh USA

XM Satellite Radio channels
Sirius XM Radio channels
Sirius Satellite Radio channels
Comedy radio stations in the United States
Radio stations established in 2001